Robert Alban (9 April 1952) was a French professional road bicycle racer. Alban won the stage 18 in the 1981 Tour de France, and finished third place in that year's overall classification.

Alban was born in Saint-André-d'Huiriat.

Major results

1976
1st GP Plumelec
1977
2nd French National Cyclo-cross Championships
1979
19th Tour de France
1980
1st Quilan
2nd French National Cyclo-cross Championships
3rd Grand Prix de Mauléon-Moulin
3rd Cholet-Pays de Loire
1981
1st Beaulac-Bernos
1st Grand Prix de Plumelec-Morbihan
1st Lescouet-Jugon
3rd Overall Tour de France
1st Stage 18
1982
1st GP des Herbiers
1st Stage 5 Critérium du Dauphiné Libéré
3rd Grand Prix de Plumelec
1983
1st Lescouet-Jugon
5th Overall Tour de France
3rd Circuit de l'Aulne
3rd Overall Critérium du Dauphiné Libéré

External links 

1952 births
Living people
French male cyclists
French Tour de France stage winners
Sportspeople from Ain
Cyclists from Auvergne-Rhône-Alpes
20th-century French people